The year 2013 was the 42nd year after the independence of Bangladesh. It was also the fifth year of the second term of the government of Sheikh Hasina.

Incumbents

 President: Zillur Rahman (till 20 March), Abdul Hamid (from 21 March)
 Prime Minister: Sheikh Hasina
 Chief Justice: Md. Muzammel Hossain

Demography

Climate

Economy

Note: For the year 2013 average official exchange rate for BDT was 78.10 per US$.

Events

 5 February – Protests broke-out in Shahbag, Dhaka following demands for capital punishment for Abdul Quader Mollah, who had been sentenced to life imprisonment earlier that day, and for others convicted of war crimes by the International Crimes Tribunal of Bangladesh. Later demands included banning the Bangladesh Jamaat-e-Islami party from politics including election and a boycott of institutions supporting (or affiliated with) the party.
 15 February - Blogger Ahmed Rajib Haider was hacked to death by machete-wielding activists from a militant group named Ansarullah Bangla Team.
 28 February - The International Crimes Tribunal sentenced Delwar Hossain Sayeedi, the Vice-President of the Jamaat-e-Islami to death for war crimes committed during the 1971 Bangladesh Liberation War. Following the sentence, activists of Jamaat-e-Islami and its student wing Islami Chhatra Shibir attacked Hindus in different parts of the country. Hindu properties were looted, Hindu houses were burnt into ashes and Hindu temples were desecrated and set on fire.
 3 March - Bangladesh Jamaat-e-Islami enforced a 48-hour hartal Protests led by Jamaate Islami activists and Sayeedi supporters were carried out during these strikes. during which, members of the Border Guards Bangladesh, and the Rapid Action Battalion (RAB) allegedly shot live ammunition and rubber bullets into unarmed crowds, which included children, conducted sweeping arrests and used other forms of excessive force during and after protests.
 20 March - The incumbent President of the country, Zillur Rahman, died at Mount Elizabeth Hospital in Singapore from a critical lung infection.
 4 April - All Bengali blogs were blacked out for an indefinite time to protest the arrest of four bloggers in Bangladesh (Moshiur Rahman Biplob, Rasel Parvez, Subrata Adhikari Shuvo and Asif Mohiuddin).
 24 April - A structural failure triggered the collapse of an eight-story commercial building called Rana Plaza in the Savar Upazila of Dhaka District which led to death of 1,134 individuals - mostly garments workers. Approximately 2,500 injured people were rescued from the building alive. It is considered the deadliest structural failure accident in modern human history also the deadliest garment-factory disaster in history.
 5 May - Mass protests and rioting took place at Shapla Square in the Motijheel area of capital Dhaka. The protests were organized by the Islamist pressure group, Hefazat-e Islam, who were demanding the enactment of a blasphemy law. The government responded to the protests by cracking down on the protesters using a combined force drawn from the police, Rapid Action Battalion and paramilitary Border Guard Bangladesh to drive the protesters out of Shapla Square.
 8 May - A fire kills 8 people in a garment factory.
 15 May - The Accord on Fire and Building Safety in Bangladesh (the Accord) was signed. It was a five-year independent, legally binding agreement between global brands and retailers and trade unions designed to build a safe and healthy Bangladeshi Ready Made Garment (RMG) Industry.
 10 July - hundreds of Bangladesh Civil Service examinees began protests demanding an immediate cancellation of all sorts of quota in public service recruitment. The protests continued for several days and turned into a nationwide movement against the Quota system in Bangladesh Civil Service recruitment.
 12 December - Convicted war criminal and Jamaat-e-Islami leader Abdul Quader Molla was hanged in Dhaka Central Jail.

Awards and recognitions

Independence Day Award

Ekushey Padak
 Rafiq Azad, language and literature
 Asad Chowdhury, language and literature
 Samson H. Chowdhury, social service (posthumous)
 Udichi Shilpi Gosthi (arts)
 Ajit Kumar Guha, Language Movement (posthumous)
 Jamaluddin Hossain, arts
 Mohammad Kamruzzaman, Language Movement (posthumous)
 Kaderi Kibria, arts
 Tofazzal Hossain, Language Movement
 Nurjahan Murshid, social service (posthumous)
 Bijoy Sarkar, arts (posthumous)
 Enamul Haque Mostafa Shahid, Liberation War.
 MA Wadud, Language Movement (posthumous)

Sports
 Football:
 Bangladesh participated in the 2014 AFC Challenge Cup qualification (Group D) matches held in Nepal. They defeated the hosts as well as the Northern Mariana Islands but they lost to Palestine and could not qualify for the next round.
 Bangladesh later participated in 2013 SAFF Championship also held in Nepal, but in this competition they could not secure any victory.
 Cricket:
 Bangladesh toured Sri Lanka from 3 to 31 March. The tour consisted of two Tests, three One Day Internationals (ODIs) and a Twenty20 International (T20I). Sri Lanka won the Test series 1-0, but the ODI series was drawn 1-1. Sri Lanka won the lone T20 Match.
 Bangladesh Cricket Board (BCB) president, Nazmul Hassan, stated on 30 May 2013 that a Bangladesh player was questioned by the ICC's Anti-Corruption and Security Unit (ACSU). He later confirmed the identity of the player as Mohammad Ashraful, the youngest centurion in test cricket. BCB decided "not to involve" former captain Mohammad Ashraful in any form of cricket until the ICC's ACSU submits its report.
 Later Bangladesh toured Zimbabwe from 17 April 2013 to 12 May 2013. The tour consisted of two Test matches, three One Day Internationals and two Twenty20 International matches. The 2-match Test series and T20 series were drawn 1–1, while Zimbabwe won the 3-match ODI series 2–1.
 The New Zealand cricket team toured Bangladesh in October and November. The tour consisted of two Test matches, three One Day Internationals and one Twenty20 International. The matches were to be played in Chittagong and Mirpur. Both Test matches ended in draws, Bangladesh won all three One Day Internationals and New Zealand won the sole Twenty20 International.
 Golf:
 Bangladeshi golfer Siddikur Rahman won Hero Indian Open as part of 2013 Asian Tour.

Deaths
 15 January - Abdus Shakur, writer (b. 1941)
 24 January - Nurul Islam, physician, national professor (b. 1928)
 6 March - Abdul Jalil, politician (b. 1939)
 16 March - Jamal Nazrul Islam, mathematical physicist (b. 1939)
 20 March - Zillur Rahman, President of Bangladesh (b.1929)
 10 April - Binod Bihari Chowdhury, activist (b. 1911)
 20 April - Amin Ahmed Chowdhury, war hero, diplomat (b. 1946)
 1 July - Mita Noor, actor (b. 1971)
 18 August - Nazim Uddin Mostan, journalist (b. 1948)
 19 August - Abdur Rahman Boyati, folk singer, composer (b. 1939)
 10 October - Dilwar Khan, poet (b. 1937)
 20 November - Rafiqul Islam, activist (b. 1950)
 20 December - Khaled Khan, actor (b. 1958)

See also 
 2010s in Bangladesh
 List of Bangladeshi films of 2013
 2012–13 Bangladeshi cricket season
 2013–14 Bangladeshi cricket season
 Timeline of Bangladeshi history

References

 
Bangladesh
2010s in Bangladesh